Jacob Bundsgaard Johansen (born 28 February 1976) is a Danish politician and is the current Mayor of Aarhus Municipality. He is a member of the Danish Social Democrats. He took over after the former mayor Nicolai Wammen, who resigned as mayor to become member of the Danish Parliament, Folketinget, in 2011.

See also 
 List of mayors of Aarhus

References

External links 
 
 Private website

Living people
1976 births
Mayors of places in Denmark
People from Aarhus
Social Democrats (Denmark) politicians